Pedro Miguel Martins Santos (born 22 April 1988) is a Portuguese professional footballer who plays as a full-back for Major League Soccer club D.C. United.

After starting out at Casa Pia, he went on to amass Primeira Liga totals of 118 matches with 22 goals at the service of Vitória de Setúbal, Rio Ave and Braga. He represented Leixões in the Liga de Honra, and also competed professionally in Romania with Astra Giurgiu and the United States with Columbus Crew.

Santos represented Portugal at under-19 level.

Club career

Early career
Born in Lisbon, Santos played youth football with three clubs, including Casa Pia A.C. from ages 13–19. He spent his first seasons as a senior in the lower leagues, scoring a career-best 17 goals in the 2009–10 season to help the team promote to the third division.

Subsequently, Santos moved to the professionals after signing with Leixões S.C. from the Liga de Honra. In his second year at the Estádio do Mar, he started in 23 of his 27 appearances (four goals) and the side finished in 11th position.

In the summer of 2012, Santos joined Vitória de Setúbal, making his debut in the Primeira Liga on 19 August of that year by coming as a 68th-minute substitute in a 2–2 away draw against C.D. Nacional, where he won a penalty and was also booked. His first goal in the league arrived on 4 November, when he played 79 minutes and helped the hosts defeat Sporting CP 2–1.

Braga
Santos moved to S.C. Braga also in the top tier in June 2013. Before the end of the transfer window he was loaned to Romanian club FC Astra Giurgiu, and scored to cap a 4–0 win at FC Oţelul Galaţi on his 15 September debut after coming on at half time for Gabriel Enache. Having made just three more appearances in all competitions, his loan was terminated in December.

On 8 January 2014, Santos was loaned again to Rio Ave F.C. in Braga's league until the end of the season alongside teammate Stanislav Kritsyuk. He played 22 total games for the team from Vila do Conde, and scored once to conclude a 3–1 away defeat of S.C. Covilhã on 26 January to qualify for the semi-finals of the Taça da Liga; he started the final defeat to S.L. Benfica and the loss to the same opponent in the Taça de Portugal decider too.

After returning to his parent club, Santos helped to consecutive fourth-place finishes and scored a total of 12 goals in the process. On 22 May 2016, he replaced Josué for the last minutes of regulation time in the national cup final (2–2 draw), and converted his penalty shootout attempt in a 4–2 victory at the Estádio Nacional.

Columbus Crew
On 7 August 2017, the 29-year-old Santos signed for Columbus Crew as a designated player, for a club record $2.3 million. He made his Major League Soccer debut 12 days later, playing 28 minutes in a 1–1 away draw against Orlando City SC.

Santos scored his first goal for the team on 24 March 2018, concluding their 3–1 home win over D.C. United. It was his only of the season, and he was sent off on 5 May in a goalless draw at Seattle Sounders FC for a kick to Alex Roldan's face.

In the 2019 campaign, Santos recorded his best professional figures of 11 goals from 33 games, though the Crew missed the playoffs. On 28 July, he scored twice in a 3–2 victory at the New York Red Bulls.

Santos scored eight goals and assisted seven in 26 matches in 2020 as the side won the MLS Cup for the first time since 2008, making him the first Portuguese to pick up a medal in the tournament. He scored an extra-time goal on 30 November in a 2–0 home win over Nashville SC in the Eastern Conference semi-finals, though he missed the final win over Seattle due to a COVID-19 diagnosis. The day after the victory, his contract option for 2021 was exercised.

Santos was fined an undisclosed amount in July 2021 for simulation against the New England Revolution. On 29 September, playing as a left-back due to injuries, he helped the Crew win 2–0 against Cruz Azul in the Campeones Cup. In December, he signed an extension for the following year with an option for 2023.

International career
Santos earned two caps for the Portugal under-19 team, in as many friendlies against Spain in March 2007.

Career statistics

Honours

Casa Pia
Terceira Divisão: 2009–10

Braga
Taça de Portugal: 2015–16

Astra Giurgiu
Cupa României: 2013–14

Columbus Crew
MLS Cup: 2020
Campeones Cup: 2021

Individual
SJPF Segunda Liga Player of the Month: November 2011
SJPF Segunda Liga Young Player of the Month: November 2011

References

External links

Columbus official profile

1988 births
Living people
Portuguese footballers
Footballers from Lisbon
Association football defenders
Association football wingers
Primeira Liga players
Liga Portugal 2 players
Casa Pia A.C. players
Leixões S.C. players
Vitória F.C. players
S.C. Braga players
Rio Ave F.C. players
Liga I players
FC Astra Giurgiu players
Major League Soccer players
Designated Players (MLS)
Columbus Crew players
D.C. United players
Portugal youth international footballers
Portuguese expatriate footballers
Expatriate footballers in Romania
Expatriate soccer players in the United States
Portuguese expatriate sportspeople in Romania
Portuguese expatriate sportspeople in the United States